Thelephoric acid is a terphenylquinone pigment that is found in several fungi, such as Omphalotus subilludens and Polyozellus multiplex. Thelephoric acid has been shown to inhibit prolyl endopeptidase, an enzyme that has a role in processing proteins (specifically, amyloid precursor protein) in Alzheimer's disease. Chemicals that inhibit prolyl endopeptidase have attracted research interest due to their potential therapeutic effects. It is derived from atromentin, and its precursor can be from cyclovariegatin. Fragmentation patterns have suggested that polymers of thelephoric acid exists.

References

Tetrols
Quinones
Hydrolase inhibitors
Catechols
Dibenzofurans
Benzofuran ethers at the benzene ring
Heterocyclic compounds with 5 rings
Vinylogous carboxylic acids
Aromatic ketones